Done with Love may refer to:

"Done with Love", song by Teenage Bottlerocket from Freak Out! (Teenage Bottlerocket album)
"Done with Love", song by Karl Wolf from Stereotype (Karl Wolf album)
"Done with Love", song by Zedd from True Colors (Zedd album)